Wang Lap Tat (June 29, 1939 – November 2, 2002), better known by his stage name Lo Lieh, was an Indonesian-born Hong Kong martial artist and film actor. Lo was perhaps best known as Chao Chih-Hao in the 1972 martial arts film King Boxer (a.k.a. Five Fingers of Death), Priest Pai Mei in Executioners from Shaolin and Clan of the White Lotus, Miyamoto in the 1977 film Fist of Fury II, and General Tien Ta in the 1978 film The 36th Chamber of Shaolin.

Early life
Lo Born in Pematangsiantar on June 29, 1939, spent his early life in Indonesia and then his parents sent him back to China and attended acting school in Hong Kong, he began his martial arts training in 1962 and joined the Shaw Brothers Studio in the same year and went on to become one of the most famous actors in Hong Kong martial arts and kung fu films in the late 1960s and 1970s.

Acting
In 1970 Lo played Kao Hsia in the film Brothers Five, alongside Cheng Pei-pei, and co-starred with Jimmy Wang Yu in The Chinese Boxer. Lo starred in  the 1972 cult classic King Boxer a.k.a. Five Fingers of Death . Lo played Ho Chiang in the 1974 film The Stranger and the Gunfighter, alongside Lee Van Cleef. In 1977, Lo portrayed Pai Mei in the Executioners from Shaolin and Miyamoto in Fist of Fury II, along with Bruce Li. Lo played General Tien Ta in the 1978 film The 36th Chamber of Shaolin, alongside Gordon Liu and Lee Hoi San.

In the 1980s, Lo directed and starred in the 1980 film Clan of the White Lotus, along with Gordon Liu. Lo played Triad Gangster Boss in the 1988 film Dragons Forever, alongside Jackie Chan, Sammo Hung and Yuen Biao. Lo played Fei in the 1989 film Miracles along with Jackie Chan, Richard Ng and Billy Chow.

In the 1990s, Lo played Choi Kun-lun in the 1991 film Sex and Zen alongside Lawrence Ng, Amy Yip and Kent Cheng. Lo played The General in the 1992 film Police Story 3: Super Cop alongside Jackie Chan and Michelle Yeoh.

In the 2000s, Lo played Wei Tung's Uncle in the 2001 film The Vampire Combat, with Collin Chou and Valerie Chow.  Lo's last film was 2001's Glass Tears, before retiring from acting at the age of 62.

Personal life
Lo married Grace Tang Chia-li on April 15, 1976. Lo and his wife later divorced. He was the brother-in-law of Stanley Tong, who is brother of wife Grace.

Death
Lo died of a heart attack on November 2, 2002. He was 63 years old.

Filmography

References

External links 
Lo Lieh - Fan Website
Lo Lieh
Filmography

1939 births
2002 deaths
Hong Kong male film actors
Indonesian people of Chinese descent
Indonesian Cantonese people
Indonesian emigrants to Hong Kong
People from Pematangsiantar
People from North Sumatra
Male Spaghetti Western actors
Shaw Brothers Studio